Stefan Despotovski (born 23 January 2003) is a Macedonian football right back.

References

External links
 

2003 births
Living people
Association football defenders
Serbian footballers
Serbian First League players
RFK Grafičar Beograd players